Wilferdingen-Singen station is a railway station in the Wilferdingen and Singen districts of the municipality of Remchingen, located in the Enzkreis district in Baden-Württemberg, Germany.

History 
The station was opened in 1861. The railway line was actually supposed to lead via Nöttingen, but its residents resisted the connection to the railway. So the construction took place at today's location. The station, which was previously only called Wilferdingen, is now called Wilferdingen-Singen by Deutsche Bahn. The Karlsruher Verkehrsverbund, however, called them Remchingen until June 2019. Previously, the municipality tried to get Deutsche Bahn to rename the station to Remchingen for reasons of uniformity, which they refused for reasons of cost.

The station is currently (as of 2020) not barrier-free. The community is in a dispute with Deutsche Bahn regarding the expansion. The big problem here is the insufficient width of the platform between tracks 2 and 3. Deutsche Bahn sees no possibility of building an elevator here.

Station terrain 
The Remchingen train station has a house platform on track 1 and a central platform on tracks 2 and 3. Three other tracks are used as overtaking and stowing tracks. The reception building is now used by restaurants and a model building association. There is a bus station, several hundred parking spaces and a taxi stand on the station forecourt. The station also has two-sided bicycle parking facilities, which are connected to one another via an underpass, as well as lockers.

Rail services

Gallery

References

External links

Railway stations in Baden-Württemberg
Buildings and structures in Enzkreis
Remchingen
Karlsruhe Stadtbahn stations